BSC Kristall, or simply Kristall, is a professional beach soccer team based in St. Petersburg, Russia. Kristall is the most successful Russian club at the Euro Winners Cup, having won four times in 2014, 2015, 2020 and 2021. Kristall are a seven-time Russian Nationals and a five-time Russian Beach Soccer Cup champions. Additionally, the team won the 2nd Russian Super Cup in 2018, defeating arch-rival BSC Lokomotiv.

The club's Brazilian forward, Mauricinho, has described Kristall as the "Real Madrid of beach soccer".

History
Kristall was founded in 2006. Since 2011, Kristall plays in the national elite division. In 2011, Kristall won their first tournament, OBSL Grand-Prix Winter, and a year later they joined the holding company NOVA Group. They reached their zenit in 2015, after winning every tournament they participated, among them the Euro Winners Cup, the Russian Nationals and the inaugural Russian Cup. In 2021, they won a record 6th Russian Nationals and a record 4th Euro Winners Cup.

Squads

Current squad

Head coach:  Angelo Schirinzi
1st coach:  Vladimir Gavrilov
2nd coach:  Aleksey Ivanov
3rd coach:  Gennadyi Tumilovich

Honours

International competitions

Euro Winners Cup
 Winners (4): 2014, 2015, 2020, 2021

Euro Winners Challenge
 Winners (1): 2018

Open Indoor Beach Soccer League
 Winners (1): 2015

Inter Cup
 Winners (2): 2017, 2018

National competitions

Russian Beach Soccer League
 Winners (7): 2013, 2015, 2016, 2018, 2019, 2021, 2022
Russian Cup
 Winners (3): 2015, 2017, 2018, 2019, 2020

Russian Super Cup
 Winners (1): 2018

Notable former players
  Elinton Andrade
  Jorginho
  Llorenç

References

External links
  
  Profile at bsrussia.ru
  Official vkontakte page
 Official Facebook page

Russian beach soccer teams
Sports clubs in Saint Petersburg